Rasathi Varum Naal is a 1991 Tamil-language horror film directed by Maniyan Sivabalan. The film stars Nizhalgal Ravi, Kasthuri and Balambika, with Nassar, Radha Ravi, Thyagu and Rajeshkumar playing supporting roles. It was released on 13 December 1991.

Plot

Radha (Kasthuri) lives a luxurious life with her widower father Rajasekhar (Nassar) in a palace. She will marry the Inspector of Police Vijay (Nizhalgal Ravi) after finishing her studies. During a college tour in Pachaimalai Hills, Radha is saved from a near-drowning by her college mates. She then finds a pendant in her pocket and she brings it at home.

Radha starts to have creepy nightmares in the night, and her pet dog died in a mysterious way. One night, a spirit flees from the pendant and it enters into Radha's body. The possessed spirit of the girl-victim Rasathi (Balambika) wants to take revenge for a gang-rape what had happened 19 years ago; the tormentors were Rajasekhar and his three friends Gowri (Radha Ravi), Kabali (Thyagu) and Rajeshkumar (Rajeshkumar). The possessed Radha mercilessly kills Rajasekhar's friends one by one. Vijay, who is in charge of the case, finds out that Radha is the killer. What transpires next forms the rest of the story.

Cast

Nizhalgal Ravi as Inspector Vijay
Kasthuri as Radha
Balambika as Rasathi
Nassar as Rajasekhar
Radha Ravi as Gowri
Thyagu as Kabali
Rajeshkumar as Rajeshkumar
A. K. Veerasamy as Rasathi's grandfather
Mayilsamy as Pazhani
Marthandan as Muthu
Vasuki as Visalam
Vaman Malini as Radha's friend

Soundtrack

The film score and the soundtrack were composed by Vijay Anand. The soundtrack, released in 1991, features 4 tracks with lyrics written by Vaali.

Release and Reception
N. Krishnaswamy of The Indian Express called the film "more-or-less a business-like desi thriller". The film was dubbed in Telugu as Durgamma in 1992.

References

1991 films
1990s Tamil-language films
Indian horror films
Indian rape and revenge films
1991 horror films